Búnker 1 de Camposoto is a bunker located in San Fernando in the Province of Cádiz, Andalusia, Spain. It was built on Camposoto beach during the Spanish Civil War.

References

Buildings and structures in San Fernando, Cádiz